Events from the year 1756 in Denmark.

Incumbents
 Monarch – Frederick V
 Prime minister – Johan Ludvig Holstein-Ledreborg

Events
 14 October – An Agreement of Friendship and Trade between Denmark and the Ottoman Empire is signed by King Frederick V and Sultan Osman III.

Births
 9 February – Friderich Christian Hager, governor of the Danish Gold Coast (died 1795)
 29 February – Christian Frederik Hansen, architect (died 1845)
 1 March – Johan Frederik Schultz, printer and publisher (died 1817)
 17 October – Isaac Abraham Euchel, author and founder of the "Haskalah movement" (died 1804)

Deaths

 12 August – Christiane Henriette Louise Juel, noblewoman and courtier (born 1706)

References

 
1750s in Denmark
Denmark
Years of the 18th century in Denmark